KPOM-CD (channel 14) is a low-power, Class A television station in Ontario, California, United States, broadcasting the digital multicast network Decades. Owned and operated by Weigel Broadcasting, the station broadcasts from a transmitter, shared with KSFV-CD, at the Mount Harvard Radio Site in the San Gabriel Mountains.

Due to its low-power status, KPOM-CD's broadcasting radius does not reach all of Greater Los Angeles. Therefore, the station shares Decades with the fourth subchannel of KTTV (channel 11).

History 
The station was founded on August 23, 1989. Originally licensed to Indio, California, it carried Retro TV programming via KRET-LP (channel 45). It later became a Spanish religious music channel, then an affiliate of ShopHQ with KDUO (channel 43) for the Palm Springs area.

In January 2022, Weigel Broadcasting removed KPOM-CD's subchannels and replacing the programming on main channel 14.1 with a simulcast of MeTV Plus on KAZA 54.3. On February 28, 2022, the MeTV Plus simulcast ended and was replaced with KPOM-CD's own feed of Decades. With this change, 14.1 was upgraded to 720p HD. On March 28, 2022, Story Television launched, replacing Decades. On May 26, 2022, Story Television moved to sister station KAZA 54.2, with Decades returning to KPOM-CD 14.1. On August 1, 2022, KPOM-CD added OnTV4U programming on digital subchannel 14.12.

Subchannels
The station's digital signal is multiplexed:

References

External links

Low-power television stations in the United States
POM-CD
Weigel Broadcasting
Television channels and stations established in 1989
1989 establishments in California
Decades (TV network) affiliates
OnTV4U affiliates